United Airlines is a major American airline.

United Airlines may also refer to:
China United Airlines, a Chinese airline
United Airlines Limited, an Ugandan airline
United International Airlines, a former cargo airline

See also 
United Airways (disambiguation)